Klaus Ignatzek is a German jazz pianist, composer and band leader who has recorded as leader for Nagel-Heyer Records, Red Records, Timeless Records, and Candid Records.

Ignatzek was born November 4,1954 in Wilhelmshaven, Germany. As jazz pianist he has been part of the formations Crossing, Jazzwheel, Klaus Ignatzek / Florian Poser Duo, Klaus Ignatzek / Martin Wind Duo, Klaus Ignatzek Group, Klaus Ignatzek Quartet, Klaus Ignatzek Quintet, Klaus Ignatzek Trio, The Klaus Ignatzek Jazztet, Voss Ignatzek Duo.

External links

References

German jazz pianists
Candid Records artists
 Nagel-Heyer Records artists
Red Records artists
Timeless Records artists
1954 births
Living people
21st-century pianists